The Limoges trolleybus system forms part of the public transport network of the city and commune of Limoges, in the Limousin region of the Great South West of France.

In operation since 1943, the system presently comprises five urban routes.  Trolleybuses are popular in Limoges for their silent operation, their lack of pollution and their performance in the steep streets.

History
Trolleybuses made their first appearance in Limoges in July 1943.  They were intended to replace the urban tramway, which was ageing and in poor condition.

The first trolleybus line was no. 2, connecting Place Carnot with Avenue Baudin. Services on this line were operated initially by Vétra CB60 vehicles. The following October, it was the turn of line 3 to be converted to trolleybus operation, again with CB60s.  Line 3 was merged directly with line 2.

In November 1945, line 6 had its trams replaced by trolleybuses, and on 4 October 1948 line 4 became a trolleybus line.

With the replacement of trams by trolleybuses on lines 5 and 1 in March and July 1951, operations on Limoges' urban tramway were finally terminated.

Since then, the city has always been faithful to its electric transport system, and its lines have been expanded over time.

In 1954, the Compagnie des Tramways Electriques de Limoges (CTEL) became the Compagnie des Trolleybus de Limoges (CTL).

Services

The current Limoges trolleybus lines are:

 1 : Route de Lyon - Porte de Louyat, by Cristalis trolleybus;
 2 : Pierre Curie - La Bastide, by Cristalis trolleybus;
 4 : Montjovis - Pôle Saint Lazare, by Cristalis trolleybus;
 5 : Jean Gagnant - Les Courrières/La Cornue (extended in 2001 to Plaisance/Roussillon, in 2004 to La Cornue and in 2009 to Les Courrières);
 6 : La Bastide 2 - Maréchal Juin (re-electrified and lengthened at both ends in 1996).

The  extension of the southern part of line 4 to serve Pôle Saint Lazare and the new clinic entered service on Monday, 6 July 2009.

The five trolleybus lines in Limoges now represent about 53% of passengers carried, and one third of the mileage on the city's overall bus network.

Fleet

As at 11 July 2011, the Limoges trolleybus fleet consisted of the following types:
 Renault ER100H (13 trolleybuses, nos 428-440).
 Irisbus Cristalis ETB12 (27 trolleybuses, nos 101-127), entered service between 2006 and 2011.

See also

Gare de Limoges
List of trolleybus systems in France

References

Notes

Further reading

External links

 Images of the Limoges trolleybus system, at railfaneurope.net
 
 

This article is based upon a translation of the French language version as at August 2011.

Limoges
Limoges
Limoges
Transport in Nouvelle-Aquitaine
1943 establishments in France